Naila Munir is a Pakistani politician who had been a Member of the Provincial Assembly of Sindh, from June 2013 to May 2018.

Early life
She was born on 11 April 1962 in Karachi.

Political career

She was elected to the Provincial Assembly of Sindh as a candidate of Muttahida Qaumi Movement on a reserved seat for women in 2013 Pakistani general election.

In March 2018, she quit MQM and joined Pak Sarzameen Party (PSP).

References

Living people
Sindh MPAs 2013–2018
1962 births
Muttahida Qaumi Movement politicians